Nelin is a surname. Notable people with the surname include:

 Andriy Nelin (born 1991), Ukrainian football player
 Dion Nelin (born 1976), Danish carom billiards player
 Jesper Nelin (born 1992), Swedish biathlete

Surnames of Scandinavian origin